Robin C. W. Tilbrook (born 1958) is an English solicitor and political leader who chairs the English Democrats, a political party he founded.  It advocates a devolved English Parliament, having previously advocated English independence from the United Kingdom.

Early life
Tilbrook was born in Kuala Lumpur, Federation of Malaya, in 1958. He was educated at Wellington College, Berkshire, gained a BA (Hons) in politics and economics from the University of Kent at Canterbury, and then studied at The College of Law, Chester.

He was a Coldstream Guardsman and has worked in a factory, in junior management, and as a teacher at primary and secondary level. By 2003, he was a solicitor and a partner in the firm of Tilbrooks in Ongar, Essex. In 2005, he commented after a case, "It is a black day in the courts when they refuse to make a declaration that St George's Day is a special occasion."

On 27 September 2011, he became a Freeman of the City of London.

Politics
He was a member of the Conservative Student Association and a member of the Conservative Party, at one time a Conservative candidate for Ongar Town council. He co-founded the English National Party in 1997, and then helped to relaunch the party as the English Democrats in 2002 to campaign for an English Parliament. He is also the leader and nominating officer. He has stood as a candidate for the English Democrats in local, parliamentary and European elections. Standing in Epping Forest, he received 1.4% of the vote in the 2005 general election, 4.4% at 2005 Essex County Council election, 18.2% in the 2007 Epping Forest District Council election, and 11.3% in the 2009 County Council election. He gained 2.01% of the vote as the lead candidate for the East of England region in the 2009 European election.

By 2006, the English Democrats, based in Norwich and chaired by Tilbrook, had adopted the policies of campaigning for a devolved English parliament, opposing membership of the European Union, opposing further immigration, and wishing to make St George's Day a national holiday.

Tilbrook said of the English Democrats in 2006 that the party "agitates for anyone living in England" and that Englishness was "akin to American notions of "Americanness": that you can be from any ethnic background and still wrap yourself in the flag." In the same year, he criticised spending on St Patrick's Day in London and added that too little was spent on St George's Day. In 2009, he said, "We're hoping to do what the Scottish National Party managed to do in the 1970s and break through to being able to influence what happens in Parliament about England". He argues that the money given by the UK to the EU is given to other parts of the country at the expense of England, which makes his party Eurosceptic.

Tilbrook has adopted a pro-Brexit stance, claiming that the United Kingdom had left the European Union on 29 March 2019. He reasoned that Theresa May had the authority to begin Britain's two-year withdrawal process from the European Union, but did not have the power to amend it, meaning that the extension granted by Brussels until 31 October 2019 was unlawful. The case, however, was rejected for a hearing on the grounds of lack of legal merit and cannot lead to a conclusion that the UK left the EU on 29  March 2019, but has been appealed to the European Court of Human Rights in Strasbourg.

Personal life
Tilbrook is the elder son of the late Brigadier Thomas William Tilbrook, Queen's Royal Irish Hussars, by his marriage to Jacqueline Mackillican. In 1988, Tilbrook became engaged to Claire Breed. They married and had three children. He is a member of the Church of England.

Elections contested
General elections

See also
Peter Davies (politician)

References

External links 
Robin Tilbrook's Facebook page
Robin Tilbrook's blog

1958 births
Living people
People educated at Wellington College, Berkshire
Alumni of the University of Kent
English politicians
English solicitors
People from the City of Chelmsford
Kuala Lumpur politicians
Leaders of political parties in the United Kingdom
English Democrats politicians